Ulawa Airport is an airport in Arona on Ulawa Island in the Solomon Islands .

Airlines and destinations

References

Airports in the Solomon Islands